Kevin Ceccon (born 24 September 1993 in Clusone) is a professional racing driver from Italy.

Career

Karting
Prior to his single–seater career, Ceccon enjoyed a long and successful spell in the junior karting ranks. In 2005 he achieved a fifth place in the Copa Campeones Trophy Junior class before finishing fourth in the Italian Open Masters KF3 category the following year. In 2008 he won the Italian Open Masters KF3 title, and also secured podium finishes in both the South Garda Winter Cup and Andrea Margutti Trophy.

Formula Three
In 2009, Ceccon took the substantial jump from karting to Formula Three, racing in the European F3 Open Championship with RP Motorsport. After a slow start to the season, he finished in the points on nine occasions to be classified 11th in the standings, with fourth–place finishes at Donington Park and Monza being his best race results. He also took part in three rounds of the Italian Formula Three season, finishing in the points in four of his six races to finish 14th in the series.

Ceccon continued with the team for a second season in 2010, improving to fourth place in the final standings after taking six podium places, including his first series win at the final round of the year in Barcelona. In September 2010, Ceccon made a one–off appearance in the Italian Formula Three Championship round at Vallelunga, retiring from the first race before finishing 12th in the second event.

GP2 Series
In November 2010, Ceccon took part in four days of post–season GP2 Series testing, held at Yas Marina Circuit in Abu Dhabi, driving for Scuderia Coloni for the first two days, before switching to DPR for the final two days.

It was announced in May 2011 that Ceccon would race in the Barcelona and Monaco rounds of the 2011 season for Scuderia Coloni, replacing fellow Italian Davide Rigon who was injured in the first round of the season in Istanbul. In doing so, he became the youngest ever GP2 Series driver, taking the record previously held by Spaniard Javier Villa by almost a year. After eight races, with a best finish of eleventh, he opted to concentrate on Auto GP, in which he was challenging for the series lead, and relinquished his seat to Luca Filippi. He finished 30th in the drivers' championship standings.

Auto GP
For the 2011 season, Ceccon graduated to the Auto GP championship, racing for Italian team Ombra Racing. He was eligible for the newly created Under 21 Trophy, which he won at the penultimate round of the season in Valencia. In doing so, he also secured a prize GP2 Series test. He currently leads the overall standings with one round of the series remaining, seven points ahead of DAMS driver Sergei Afanasiev.

GP3 Series
Ceccon moved to the GP3 Series for 2012, driving for Ocean Racing Technology.

Formula One
Ceccon tested with Toro Rosso at the 2011 Abu Dhabi young driver test during the week after the Grand Prix there. He drove on the second day of the test (November 16), after Stefano Coletti drove on the first, and finished the day with the 10th fastest time, 4.620s behind Jean-Éric Vergne, who set the fastest time.

Racing record

Career summary

† Ceccon was ineligible for a championship position.

Complete Auto GP results
(key) (Races in bold indicate pole position) (Races in italics indicate fastest lap)

Complete GP2 Series results
(key) (Races in bold indicate pole position) (Races in italics indicate fastest lap)

Complete GP2 Final results
(key) (Races in bold indicate pole position) (Races in italics indicate fastest lap)

Complete GP3 Series results
(key) (Races in bold indicate pole position) (Races in italics indicate fastest lap)

Complete European Le Mans Series results

Complete Blancpain GT Series Sprint Cup results

Complete World Touring Car Cup results
(key) (Races in bold indicate pole position) (Races in italics indicate fastest lap)

References

External links
  
 
 

1993 births
Living people
People from Clusone
Italian racing drivers
Euroformula Open Championship drivers
Italian Formula Three Championship drivers
Auto GP drivers
GP2 Series drivers
Italian GP3 Series drivers
International GT Open drivers
World Touring Car Cup drivers
Arden International drivers
Sportspeople from the Province of Bergamo
European Le Mans Series drivers
Blancpain Endurance Series drivers
RP Motorsport drivers
Ombra Racing drivers
Scuderia Coloni drivers
Ocean Racing Technology drivers
Trident Racing drivers
Jenzer Motorsport drivers
Murphy Prototypes drivers
ISR Racing drivers
Hyundai Motorsport drivers